The Gregorian mission was a group of Italian monks and priests sent by Pope Gregory the Great to Britain in the late 6th and early 7th centuries to convert and Christianize the Anglo-Saxons from their native Anglo-Saxon paganism. The first group consisted of about 40 monks and priests, some of whom had been monks in Gregory's own monastery in Rome. After a long trip, during which they almost gave up and returned to Rome, they arrived in the Anglo-Saxon kingdom of Kent in 597.  Gregory sent a second group of missionaries in 601 as reinforcements, along with books and relics for the newly founded churches. From Kent, the missionaries spread to the East Anglian kingdom and to the north of Britain, but after King Æthelberht of Kent's death, the mission was mostly confined to Kent. Another mission was sent to the kingdom of Northumbria when Æthelberht's daughter married King Edwin of Northumbria around 625. After Edwin's death in 633, a pagan backlash against Christianization occurred, and the mission was again confined to Kent; most of the missionaries fled Northumbria because they feared the pagans who returned to power after Edwin's death.

The main source for information on the missionaries is the Historia ecclesiastica gentis Anglorum of the medieval writer Bede, written around 731. Bede details several of the members of the mission. Another important source of information is the papal registers which list copies of Gregory's letters sent to the missionaries. Neither source gives a complete listing of the missionaries in either group, so a listing of members must be gathered from scattered references in Bede and Gregory's letters. Although it is known that about 40 people were included in the first group, how many arrived in the second group is unknown. The vagaries of the evidence allow only some of the missionaries to be named.

Many of the known members became bishops or archbishops, while most of the remainder became abbots. The lone exception is James the Deacon, who never held a higher office than deacon in the church. Among the archbishops were the first five Archbishops of Canterbury: Augustine, Laurence, Mellitus, Justus, and Honorius; all of them were later canonized as saints. Two other missionaries, Paulinus and Romanus, also became bishops. The last group of missionaries became the abbots of the monastery founded by Augustine at Canterbury, later known as St Augustine's Abbey after Augustine. The abbots included Gratiosus, John, Peter, Petronius, and Rufinianus. As well as the five archbishops, three other members of the mission are regarded as saints: Peter, James the Deacon, and Paulinus.

Members
The date of arrival is either 597 with the first group of missionaries or 601 with the second group. The date of arrival for some members is not known. The third column lists the major ecclesiastical office held by the missionary. The death dates are not always known, in which case approximate dates are listed. The last column notes if the member is regarded as a saint.

Citations

General

Specific

References

  
  
 
  
  
 
 
 
 
 
 
 
 
 

 Members of the Gregorian mission, List of
Italian Roman Catholic missionaries
Gregorian Mission
Gregorian mission